Salkyn-Tör Nature Park is a national park in Naryn District of Naryn Region of Kyrgyzstan established in May 2001. It is located 20 km to the east of Naryn. The purpose of the park is general environmental improvement of the country and conservation of the unique natural places, including rocky gorges and the Kojo-Üngkür cave. The area of the park is 10,419 hectares.

References

Protected areas established in 2001
National parks of Kyrgyzstan